is a Japanese anime director. He starting working in 2008 and directed his first series in 2014 with Psycho-Pass 2. He later directed Infini-T Force and Babylon.

Biography
Kiyotaka Suzuki was born in Bunkyō, Tokyo, in 1971. In elementary school, Suzuki was a fan of novel writers Jules Berne and Ranpo Edogawa. Once in middle school, Suzuki became more interested in crafting things. During this time, he also developed a passion for anime. So, he decided to become a director in order to do both at once.

In 2020, Suzuki was nominated for best director at the Crunchyroll Anime Awards.

Works

TV series
 Yozakura Quartet: Hana no Uta (2013) (assistant director)
 Psycho-Pass 2 (2014) (director)
 Infini-T Force (2017) (director)
 FLCL Alternative (2018) (assistant director)
 Babylon (2019) (director)
 My Isekai Life (2022) (assistant director)

Films
 Evangelion: 3.0 You Can (Not) Redo (2012) (chief unit director)

References

External links
 

1979 births
Anime directors
Japanese film directors
Japanese storyboard artists
Japanese television directors
Living people
People from Bunkyō